The 1981 Stanford Cardinals football team represented Stanford University in the Pacific-10 Conference during the 1981 NCAA Division I-A football season. Led by second-year head coach Paul Wiggin, the Cardinal had an overall record of 4–7 (4–4 in Pac-10, tied for sixth), and played home games on campus at Stanford Stadium in Stanford, California. Ranked in the preseason top twenty, Stanford opened with four losses and dropped six of its first seven games to incur their first losing season since 1963.

From 1972 until November 17, 1981, Stanford's official nickname was Cardinals, in reference to one of the school colors, not the bird. After 1981, it became the singular Cardinal.

Roster
QB John Elway
HB Darrin Nelson

Schedule

Game summaries

at Purdue

San Jose State

Ohio State

at Arizona

UCLA

at Southern California

Arizona State

at Washington

at Oregon State

Oregon

California

Source: Eugene Register-Guard

References

Stanford
Stanford Cardinal football seasons
Stanford Cardinals football